Radowo Małe  is a village in Łobez County, West Pomeranian Voivodeship, in northwestern Poland. It is the seat of the gmina (administrative district) called Gmina Radowo Małe. 

The village has a population of 1,200.

References

Villages in Łobez County